The 1990 United States Senate election in Kentucky was held on November 6, 1990. Incumbent Republican U.S. Senator Mitch McConnell won re-election to a second term.

Democratic primary

Candidates 
 Harvey Sloane, former Mayor of Louisville
 John Brock, Kentucky Superintendent of Public Education

Results

Republican primary

Candidates 
 Mitch McConnell, incumbent U.S. Senator
 Tommy Klein, perennial candidate

Results

General election

Candidates 
 Mitch McConnell (R), incumbent U.S. Senator
 Harvey Sloane (D), former Mayor of Louisville, Kentucky

Results

See also 
 1990 United States Senate elections

References 

1990 Kentucky elections
Kentucky
1990